Gadilanka is a village in Mummidivaram Mandal of Dr. B.R. Ambedkar Konaseema district, Andhra Pradesh, India.

Demographics
According to Indian census, 2001, the demographic details of this village is as follows:
 Total Population: 	1,386 in 365 Households.
 Male Population: 	697
 Female Population: 	689
 Children Under 6-years: 	136 (Boys - 76 and Girls - 60)
 Total Literates: 	954

References

Villages in Mummidivaram mandal